BT Wi-fi is a wi-fi hotspot service provided by BT Group for the UK. It was established following a rebranding of the former BT Openzone and BT Fon, bringing both of the services under one name, until the Fon partnership ended.  It supports the BT Consumer division. It is the UK's largest wi-fi network  with more than 5 million hotspots in the UK.

References

External links
 BT Wi-fi website

BT Group
Wi-Fi providers